Berikh is a town in Eritrea.  It is located in the Maekel (Central) region and is the capital of Berikh District.

References
Statoids.com, retrieved December 8, 2010

Populated places in Eritrea
Central Region (Eritrea)